Rapid Deployment Unit is a special police unit in North Macedonia.

Notable domestic missions

Weapons
Glock 17
Zastava М-70
X95-S
Zastava М-92
Zastava М-76
Zastava М-93 (nicknamed "black lighting")
AR-M1
Dragunov sniper rifle
McMillan Tac 50
Sako TRG
PK machine gun

See also
Special Operations Unit - Tigers
Lions (police unit)
Alpha (Police Unit)
Border Police
Special Support Unit
Ministry of Internal Affairs
Police of North Macedonia
Lake Patrol

External links
 Video of RDU

References

Police tactical units
Specialist law enforcement agencies of North Macedonia